The Press and Journal was a weekly newspaper which served Dauphin County, Pennsylvania in the United States. It was owned by Joe and Louise Sukle.

It had a circulation of approximately 8,000 copies in the Highspire, Hummelstown, Londonderry Township, Lower Swatara Township, Middletown, and Royalton.

History 
The newspaper was founded in 1854.

In July 2020, the newspaper ceased its operations.

See also

List of newspapers in Pennsylvania

References

External links
 Press and Journal

Dauphin County, Pennsylvania
Defunct newspapers published in Pennsylvania
Publications established in 1854
Publications disestablished in 2020
Weekly newspapers published in the United States
1854 establishments in Pennsylvania
2020 disestablishments in Pennsylvania